Pablo Cuevas was the defending champion but chose not to participate.

Roberto Carballés Baena won the title after defeating Gijs Brouwer 6–1, 6–1 in the final.

Seeds

Draw

Finals

Top half

Bottom half

References

External links
Main draw
Qualifying draw

Tunis Open - 1
2022 Singles